Booz Allen Hamilton may refer to:

 Booz Allen Hamilton, a strategy and technology consulting firm serving US federal, state, and local government entities. 
 Booz Allen Classic, a former PGA Tour golf event sponsored by Booz Allen Hamilton.  
 Strategy&, formerly known as Booz & Company, a global management consulting firm now part of PricewaterhouseCoopers.